Osroes II  (also spelled Chosroes II or Khosrow II;  Husrōw), was a claimant of the throne of the Parthian Empire c. 190. He is unknown to history except for the coins he issued. The date of his reign suggests that he rebelled against Vologases IV but was unable to maintain himself against Vologases V. His coins were issued by the mint at Ecbatana, suggesting that he controlled Media.

References

Sources
 

2nd-century Parthian monarchs
2nd-century Iranian people